Viddenes folk (The People of the Mountain Plateau) is a Norwegian romantic drama film from 1928 directed by Ragnar Westfelt. Westfelt also wrote the script and was the production manager. The script was based on a story by Bertil Lundquister.

The indoor scenes were recorded in the Spisesalen in Fossheim Sæter and the outdoor scenes in Fosheim Sæter, Nystuen, Filefjell, and Nordland. The film premiered at the Admiral-Palads cinema in Oslo on December 26, 1928.

Plot
The film tells about a Sámi couple that fall in love with each other against the wishes of the woman's father. The woman in the couple, Nina, is enchanted to believe that her chosen one, Lapp-Nils, is a murderer, and she reluctantly agrees to marry the man her father has chosen, Mats. When the wedding day comes, Mats drinks himself senseless and sets fire to the tent they live in. While this is going on, Lapp-Nils manages to say to Nina that he wants to meet her later at Storevaren. Mats thinks that Lapp-Nils is dead, and he is so frightened when he sees him that he confesses to having committed the reindeer thefts that Lapp-Nils was accused of, and then he staggers out into the night to a cliff, where he falls and dies. Lapp-Nils and Nina meet, and together with a herd of 100 reindeer they go to other regions.

In the censorship of the film, a number of bloody scenes were cut.

Cast
Mona Mårtenson as Nina
Einar Tveito as Lapp-Nils
Tryggve Larssen as Borka, Nina's father
Tore Lindwall as Mats
Sigurd Eldegard as the judge
Snefrid Aukland as a sorceress

References

External links
 
 Viddenes folk at the National Library of Norway
 Viddenes folk at Filmfront
 Viddenes folk at the Swedish Film Database

1928 films
Norwegian romantic drama films
Norwegian black-and-white films
Norwegian silent feature films